Juno Maria Petra Blom (born 8 October 1968) is a Swedish politician for the Liberals who served as the party secretary from June 2019 to April 2022. Blom became a member of the Liberals in 2017 and was elected as a member of the Riksdag after the 2018 Swedish general election, representing her home constituency Östergötland County, and campaigning that she would bring up policies and questions surrounding children's rights and the fight against honor violence. For twelve years, she has advocated against honor violence and honor oppresition in the regional council for Östergötland county.

She currently takes up seat number 149 in the Riksdag. Before becoming secretary of the Liberals, she was a member of the Education Committee from October 2018 until February 2019, when she left the committee to become a member of the Justice Committee, on which she remained until September 2019. After she left the Justice Committee, she became a member of the War Delegation.

Blom was during her adolescent years a promising golf player among the Norrköping Golfclub.

Awards 
Blom was awarded the Pela och Fadime (Pela och Fadime-utmärkelsen) award in 2018 for her fight against honor violence and oppression.

References 

1968 births
21st-century Swedish women politicians
Leaders of political parties in Sweden
Living people
Members of the Riksdag 2018–2022
Members of the Riksdag 2022–2026
Members of the Riksdag from the Liberals (Sweden)
People from Norrköping Municipality
Women members of the Riksdag